Ernesto Diaz Gonzalez (born 1939) (in Spanish) is a Puerto Rican sportscaster who has worked since 1962 on Puerto Rican television. Diaz Gonzalez has narrated various sports such as baseball and boxing, but he is better known for his narration of BSN and Puerto Rican men's national team basketball games. Ernesto Diaz Gonzalez is also known by the Puerto Rican public as "Ernestito".

Biography
Ernesto Diaz Gonzalez grew up as a fan of cockfighting. His father took him to watch cockfights at a local cockfighting arena when he was about 11 or 12 years old. Later, Diaz Gonzalez attended university, where he began learning some phrases that he would later use during basketball game transmissions.

By 1980, Diaz Gonzalez had been hired as a special-events sportscaster by Telemundo Puerto Rico, which had Junior Abrams as their main sportscaster and sports news reporter. In 1985, Diaz Gonzalez moved to Telemundo Puerto Rico's rival station canal 4.

2014 Puerto Rican Sports Hall of Fame Controversy
During its 2014 induction ceremony, the Puerto Rican Sports Hall of Fame was to induct Diaz Gonzalez as a sportscaster, along with former baseball players Bernie Williams and Carlos Baerga, and former basketball player Jerome Mincy. Diaz Gonzalez, however, did not accept the induction, alleging that he had felt shunned by the Hall of Fame for 15 prior years. (in Spanish)

Personal
Diaz Gonzalez is married to Norma Hernandez, who inspired him to use some phrases during basketball game transmissions.

Phrases
Diaz Gonzalez has coined some phrases during televised basketball games that have become popular in Puerto Rican Spanish jargon. Some are:

"Gulu gulu y pa' fuera" (loosely translated to "round and round and it goes out")-when someone's shot goes around the rim and then drops out.
"Y va seguir!" ("He-or she-keeps it going!")-when someone has scored many points and makes another basket
"Agua pa' los gallos!" ("throw water at the cocks")-when a team has scored the basket likely to secure the game for them. Diaz Gonzalez was inspired to use this by his days attending cockfights, where a beaten cock would get water thrown over it.
"Echale" (loosely translated to "put it in")-when someone makes a three-point shot.
"De lagrimita!" (loosely translated to "by a tear!") when a shot goes in after almost being missed

Youtube channel
Diaz Gonzalez has begun his own Youtube.com channel, where he downloads videos of past BSN basketball games.

See also
Manolo Rivera Morales
Rafael Bracero-Fellow sportscaster and Diaz Gonzalez's sportscasting mate
Fufi Santori
List of Puerto Ricans
Junior Abrams

References

1939 births
Living people
Puerto Rican television journalists